String drum can refer to:
 Tambourine de Bearn a string drum that looks like a zither
 Lion's roar (instrument), a type of friction drum